Phlegra most often refers to:
 Phlegra (mythology), a location in both Greek and Roman mythology
 Phlegra (spider), a large genus of jumping spiders

It may also refer to:
    
 Phlegra (Xenakis), a 1975 composition by Iannis Xenakis